Luis Marcelo Torres (born 6 November 1997) is an Argentine professional footballer who plays as a forward for Akritas Chlorakas, on loan from Pafos.

Club career

Boca Juniors
A graduate of the Boca Juniors football academy, having joined the club in 2012, Torres signed his first professional contract in December 2016, aged 19. Earlier in the month, he had led Boca's reserve side to victory in the Superclásico, scoring twice in a 2–0 win over River Plate. He ended the season as the reserve league's top goalscorer, with 14 goals.

Loans to Talleres Córdoba & Banfield
In August 2017, Torres joined fellow Primera División side Talleres Córdoba, signing on a season-long loan with the club retaining the option of purchase. He made a goalscoring debut for the club on 26 August, coming off the bench to score in a 5–2 league win over Lanús. His time at the club was marred by injury, however, and at the end of the season he left to join Banfield on a further loan.

Pafos and loans
On 13 September 2020, Pafos announced the signing of Torres.
On 17 June 2022, Riga announced the loan of Torres until the end of the season.
On 24 January 2023, Akritas Chlorakas announced the return of Torres on loan until the end of the season.

International career

Argentina national youth teams
Torres made his international debut for Argentina at youth level in 2017 and represented his nation at the 2017 Campeonato Sudamericano Sub-20, ending as the tournament's joint-top scorer with five goals in seven appearances. Later that year, he took part in the FIFA U-20 World Cup and scored twice before Argentina were eliminated from the group stages.

Career statistics

Club
 

1 Includes Copa Argentina matches.
2 Includes Copa Sudamericana matches.

References

1997 births
Living people
Association football forwards
Argentine footballers
Argentina under-20 international footballers
Argentine Primera División players
Talleres de Córdoba footballers
Club Atlético Banfield footballers
People from Temperley
Pafos FC players
Sportspeople from Buenos Aires Province